The Botfei is a right tributary of the river Beliu in Romania. It flows into the Beliu in Comănești.

References

Rivers of Romania
Rivers of Arad County